Benny Shanon (born 1948) is an emeriti professor of psychology at the Hebrew University of Jerusalem and holds the Mandel Chair in cognitive psychology and education. Born in Tel Aviv, Shanon studied philosophy and linguistics at Tel Aviv University and received his doctorate in experimental psychology from Stanford University.  He is best known for the Biblical entheogen hypothesis, the idea that the use of hallucinogenic drugs influenced religion.

Work
Shanon is the author of the 2002 book  Antipodes of the Mind: Charting the Phenomenology of the Ayahuasca Experience published by Oxford University Press. In this work, Shanon provides a rough cartography of the visions and non-visual effects ayahuasca can induce. He writes that he had consumed ayahuasca himself several hundred times and gathered a corpus of empirical data from published literature, structured and unstructured interviews he conducted and his personal experience. In total the corpus comprises some 2,500 ayahuasca experiences.

Biblical entheogen hypothesis
Shanon's controversial theory that the patriarch Moses was under the influence of hallucinogens when he received the law, is referred to as the Biblical entheogen hypothesis. His paper, Biblical Entheogens: a Speculative Hypothesis details parallels between the effects induced by the psychedelic brew ayahuasca, and the Bible's account of the life of Moses. In particular, he draws attention to five specific episodes of Moses' life that he believes exhibit patterns very similar to the experience encountered by those under the influence of ayahuasca:
 Moses' vision of the burning bush
 When rods belonging to Moses' brother Aaron, and the Pharaoh's sorcerers, are transformed into serpents.
 The theophany at Mount Sinai, when Moses is given the Ten Commandments.
 , when Moses asks to see God, but God tells him that he'll cover Moses with his hand so he can see only his back, not his face, "for there shall no man see Me and live."
 The shining appearance of Moses' face when he brings back the Ten Commandments on his second return from the Mount.
Encountering the Divine, altered perception of time, synaesthesia, fear of impending death, and visions of fire, serpents, light perceived as God, and entities whose faces aren't visible, are all experiences that Shanon has found to be common after ingesting ayahuasca, and most are "especially symptomatic" of ayahuasca. It is these experiences, among others, that Shanon parallels with the above events of Moses' life. He also makes note of the similarities between the three-day purification before the Ten Commandments were revealed and the traditional contexts of ayahuasca use; the "shining" appearance of people after taking ayahuasca with Moses' appearance after returning the second time from the Mount; as well as the responsiveness of the ayahuasca experience to certain personality traits that Moses possessed. He further corroborates his hypothesis with botanical and ethnobotanical information, linguistic considerations, exegesis of Talmudic and mystical Jewish texts, as well as data on the effects of a substance analogous to ayahuasca. Shannon states that his hypothesis is "admittedly speculative". He concludes by saying:
Taken together, the botanical and anthropological data on the one hand, and the biblical descriptions as well as later Jewish hermeneutics on the other, are, I propose, suggestive of a biblical entheogenic connection. Admittedly, the smoking gun is not available to us. However, so many clues present themselves which, like the pieces of a jigsaw puzzle, seem to cohere into an intriguing unified whole. I leave it to the reader to pass his or her judgment.

See also
John Marco Allegro

References

External links
Benny Shanon's Hebrew University faculty page

1948 births
Israeli cognitive scientists
Israeli Jews
Israeli psychologists
People from Tel Aviv
Psychedelic drug advocates
Tel Aviv University alumni
Academic staff of the Hebrew University of Jerusalem
Psychedelic drug researchers
Living people